One Wish may refer to:
One Wish (film), a 2010 American drama directed by Felix Limardo
One Wish (Deborah Cox album), 1998
One Wish: The Holiday Album, 2003, by Whitney Houston
"One Wish" (Hiroshima song), 1986, from the album Another Place
"One Wish" (Ray J song), 2005, from the album Raydiation
"One Wish" (Roxette song), 2006, from the album A Collection of Roxette Hits: Their 20 Greatest Songs!
"One Wish (for Christmas)", 1994 by Freddie Jackson, from his album Freddie Jackson at Christmas